William Beadling (21 August 1885 – 1944) was an English professional footballer who played as a winger.

References

1885 births
1944 deaths
Footballers from Sunderland
English footballers
Association football wingers
Ashington A.F.C. players
Grimsby Town F.C. players
Northampton Town F.C. players
Wallsend F.C. players
Blyth Spartans A.F.C. players
English Football League players
Date of death missing